The , also known as the Kyoto Prefectural Botanical Garden, is a major botanical garden with conservatory located next to the Kamo River, Hangi-cho Simogamo, Sakyō-ku, Kyoto, Japan. It is open daily; a general admission fee is charged, and an additional fee is charged for accessing the conservatory.

The garden was first established in 1924. As WW2 ended, this garden was designated as a garrison by occupation forces. And it was seized in 1946.

Plant 
As of 2007, it contains about 120,000 plants representing some 12,000 species and is organized into the following major areas: Bamboo Garden; Bonsai Exhibit; Camellia Garden; Cherry Trees; European Style Garden; Flower Bed; Hydrangea Garden; Japanese Iris Garden; Japanese Native Plants; Lotus Pond; Nakaragi-no-mori Pond (trees native to the Yamashiro Basin); Peony Garden; Perennial and Useful Plants Garden; Sunken Garden; and the Uma Grove.

The garden also contains a very substantial conservatory complex (4,694 m²) containing about 25,000 specimens representing 4,500 species. It is a set of rooms shaped to resemble the nearby Kinkaku-ji Temple and Kyoto's northern mountains, built of glass with iron frames, and opened in 1992. It currently contains the following areas: Ananas Room; Aquatic and Carnivorous Plants; Bromeliads Room; Desert and Savanna Plants Room; Forest Succulent Plants Room; Jungle Zone; Orchids Room; Potted Plants Room; Tropical Alpine Plants Room; and Tropical Produce Room.

Location and access 
The garden is located in northern part of Kyoto city and accessible by public transports. Parking is also available for car and bicycle.

 Main gate
 Metro: Gate 3, Kitaōji Station on Karasuma line
 Bus stop: Botanical garden(in Japanese 植物園)  on line 1, 204, 205, 206, N8 of Kyoto City Bus, and line 32, 34, 35, 45, 46 by Kyoto Bus.
 Kitayama gate
 Metro: Gate 3, Kitayama station on Karasuma line.
 Kamogawa gate
 Bus stop: Kitayama-bashi higashi-zume (in Japanese 北山橋東詰) on line N8 of Kyoto City Bus.
 Hokusen gate
 Connected to Inamori Memorial Hall of Kyoto Prefectural University.

Gallery

See also 
 List of botanical gardens in Japan

References and external links 

 The Kyoto Botanical Garden (Guide Map), undated brochure, Kyoto Botanical Garden (August 2007)
 The Conservatory: The Kyoto Botanical Garden, undated brochure, Kyoto Botanical Garden (August 2007)
 Kyoto Botanical Gardens

Geography of Kyoto
Botanical gardens in Japan
Gardens in Kyoto Prefecture
Greenhouses in Japan
Tourist attractions in Kyoto